Mindyak (Mindäk) is a rural locality (a selo) and the administrative centre of Mindyaksky Selsoviet, Uchalinsky District, Bashkortostan, Russia. The population was 2,282 as of 2010. There are 56 streets.

Geography 
Mindyak is located 69 km southwest of Uchaly (the district's administrative centre) by road. Karaguzhino is the nearest rural locality.

References 

Rural localities in Uchalinsky District